Stanley Walter Neale  (1894-1918) was an Australian rules footballer who played with University in the Victorian Football League. He studied law at the University of Melbourne before enlisting in the army for World War I. Awarded the Military Cross for bravery, he was killed by a shell in France in 1918.

See also
 List of Victorian Football League players who died in active service

Footnotes

Sources
Holmesby, Russell & Main, Jim (2007). The Encyclopedia of AFL Footballers. 7th ed. Melbourne: Bas Publishing.

1894 births
Australian rules footballers from Melbourne
University Football Club players
Australian recipients of the Military Cross
1918 deaths
Australian military personnel killed in World War I
People from Carlton, Victoria
Military personnel from Melbourne